Lasiochilus pallidulus is a species of true bug in the family Lasiochilidae. It is found in the Caribbean Sea, Central America, and North America.

References

Further reading

 

Articles created by Qbugbot
Insects described in 1871
Lasiochilidae